Armenia competed at the 2015 World Aquatics Championships in Kazan, Russia from 24 July to 9 August 2015.

Diving

Armenian divers qualified for the individual spots and the synchronized teams at the World Championships.

Men

Swimming

Armenian swimmers have achieved qualifying standards in the following events (up to a maximum of 2 swimmers in each event at the A-standard entry time, and 1 at the B-standard):

Men

Women

Mixed

References

External links
Kazan 2015 Official Site

Nations at the 2015 World Aquatics Championships
2015 in Armenian sport
Armenia at the World Aquatics Championships